Greg Rusedski was the defending champion, but lost in the quarterfinals this year.

Paradorn Srichaphan won the title, defeating Thomas Johansson 1–6, 7–6(7–4), 6–3 in the final.

Seeds

  Paradorn Srichaphan (champion)
  Mardy Fish (withdrew because of a shoulder injury)
  Jonas Björkman (second round)
  Max Mirnyi (first round)
  Vincent Spadea (second round)
  Taylor Dent (semifinals)
  Hicham Arazi (quarterfinals)
  Jürgen Melzer (first round)

Draw

Finals

Top half

Bottom half

References

 Main Draw
 Qualifying Draw

Nottingham Open
2004 ATP Tour
2004 Nottingham Open